Frances L. Marshall (née Bridges, 1839-1920), who wrote under the pseudonym Alan St. Aubyn, was a British author.    Many of her novels are set in Cambridge colleges.

Selected works
 St. Aubyn, Alan, and Walt Wheeler. (1890). A Fellow of Trinity.
 St. Aubyn, Alan. (1904). The Ordeal of Sara. London: White. 
 St. Aubyn, Alan. (1908). The Harp of Life. London, F.V. White & Co.

References

1839 births
1920 deaths
20th-century English women writers
20th-century English writers
English women novelists